Aliabad Yek (Romanized as Ālīābād-e Yek; also known as ‘Ālīābād) is a village in Deh Bakri Rural District, in the Central District of Bam County, Kerman Province, Iran. At the 2016 census, its population was 15, in 7 families.

References 

Populated places in Bam County